Bajgan may refer to:
 Bajgan, Kerman (بجگان - Bajgān)
 Bajgan, Yazd (باجگان - Bājgān)
 Bajgan Rural District, in Kerman Province